When I Saw You may refer to:

 "When I Saw You" (Mariah Carey song), a 1995 song from Daydream
 When I Saw You (film), a 2012 Palestinian drama